Lea Sophie Barth (born 10 December 1998 in Sömmerda) is a German female canoeist who won two medals at senior level at the Wildwater Canoeing World Championships.

Medals at the World Championships
Senior

U23

References

External links
 

1998 births
Living people
German female canoeists
Place of birth missing (living people)